Aloe suzannae is an endangered species of plant in the genus Aloe, indigenous to the south of Madagascar.

Description
It is exceptional in its genus in having nocturnal fragrant flowers, presumably pollinated by nocturnal animals such as bats and small lemurs. It flowers very rarely, but the inflorescence is exceptionally long and lasts for over a month. 
Its long tubular leaves are relatively soft and rubbery in texture, with rounded tips, and can assume a pink or turquoise colour. 
Aloe suzannae is extremely slow-growing, but eventually becomes tall and arborescent.  It has been observed in the wild with flowers open during the day. There has never been an observation of lemur pollination on Aloe suzannae and flying insects were observed visiting the flowers.  Many plants were observed in flower in late July and early August in situ.

Distribution
This aloe is endemic to Madagascar, occurring in the dryer south and south-west of the island (Ambosary and Itampolo). Here it grows in sandy soil near the coast, or among rocks.

References

Sources

suzannae
Endemic flora of Madagascar
Taxonomy articles created by Polbot
Flora of the Madagascar spiny thickets